was a renowned Japanese lyricist. Vice-president of the Japan Lyricists' Association. Earlier he used the pen name "" (pronounced the same).

Songs with lyrics by Yoshioka

Kayōkyoku 
 Kazuhiko Shima 
 Seri Ishikawa 
 Hiroshi Itsuki 
 Eisaku Ōkawa 
 Eiko Segawa 
 Kaoru Chiga 
 Kenji Niinuma 
 Nobue Matsubara 
 Hibari Misora , 
 Shin'ichi Mori 
 George Yamamoto 
 The King Tones (Tatsurō Yamashita) 
 Cute "Edo no Temari Uta II"
 Hiroyuki Okita "Kimi Ni Sasageru Lullaby" (Captain Tsubasa)

Nursery songs
 "Omocha no cha-cha-cha" (おもちゃのチャチャチャ), co-lyricist with Akiyuki Nosaka

Awards 
 1989: 31st Japan Record Awards — Lyrics Award — for Akari Uchida's 
 1980: 13th Japan Lyrics Award — for Miyako Harumi's 
 1990: 23rd Japan Versification Award — for Sayuri Ishikawa's 
 2003:
 36th Japan Versification Award — for Miyuki Kawanaka's 
 Medal with Purple Ribbon

References 

1934 births
2010 deaths
Japanese lyricists
Musicians from Yamaguchi Prefecture
20th-century Japanese musicians